For Michael Hannas is a compilation album by Pelt, released in 1998 through VHF Records. It contains various unreleased recordings by the band.

Track listing

Personnel 
Pelt
 Patrick Best – instruments
 Mike Gangloff – vocals, instruments
 Jack Rose – instruments
Production and additional personnel
 Beth Jones – drums on "Goodwin's Ferry Sunrise"
 Amy Shea – fiddle on "Techeod", "Bring Me the Head" and "Goodwin's Ferry Sunrise"
 Mick Simmons – tabla on "Goodwin's Ferry Sunrise"
 Coolidge Winesett – fiddle on "Twin Sisters"

References

External links 
 

1998 compilation albums
Pelt (band) albums
VHF Records compilation albums